Jean-Baptiste Morin (September 22, 1840 – February 20, 1911) was a Canadian politician.

Born in Sainte-Hénédine, Dorchester County, Lower Canada, Morin moved to the United States in 1856 and lived there for thirty-two years. Returning to Quebec, he was Warden of the County of Dorchester and President of the School Commissioners in Sainte-Hénédine. He was a J.P. and was elected Mayor of Sainte-Hénédine in 1889. He was first elected to the House of Commons of Canada for the electoral district of Dorchester in the general elections of 1896. A Conservative, he was re-elected in 1900 and 1904.

References
 The Canadian Parliament; biographical sketches and photo-engravures of the senators and members of the House of Commons of Canada. Being the tenth Parliament, elected November 3, 1904
 

1840 births
1911 deaths
Conservative Party of Canada (1867–1942) MPs
Mayors of places in Quebec
Members of the House of Commons of Canada from Quebec
Canadian expatriates in the United States